David Blair is a British film and television director. He has received a BAFTA award for The Street.

Blair directed Common, a 2014 BBC One 90-minute made-for-television drama, written by Jimmy McGovern and starring Michelle Fairley, Nico Mirallegro and Michael Gambon, which sought to question some of the issues and challenges raised by England's common purpose legal doctrine.

During 2014 Blair completed the feature film The Messenger (released 2015), starring Robert Sheehan, Lily Cole, Tamzin Merchant, Joely Richardson and David O'Hara.

His 2016 feature film Away starred Timothy Spall, Juno Temple, Matt Ryan and Susan Lynch. Blair then went on to complete another Jimmy McGovern film for the BBC, Reg (2016) starring Tim Roth and Anna Maxwell Martin. Blair worked with Jimmy McGovern in The Lakes (1997), The Street (2006–09) and Accused (2010–12).

Filmography
 Tabloid (2001)
 Mystics (2003)
 The Fattest Man in Britain (2009)
 Best Laid Plans (2012)
 Bert and Dickie (2012)
 Common (2014)
 The Messenger (2015)
 Away (2016)
Hurricane (2018) - aka Mission of Honor (US title)

TV movies 

 The Brown Man (1993)
 Vicious Circle (1999)
 Split Second (1999)
 Donovan Quick (2000)
 Malice Aforethought (2005)
 Whatever Love Means (2005)
 Reg (2016)
 The Block (2018)
 Care (2018)

Television
 City Lights (1989) - 1 episode
 The Play on One (1990) - 1 episode
 Strathblair (1992) - 6 episodes
 Takin' Over the Asylum (1994)
 The Vet (1995) - 2 episodes
 A Mug's Game (1996)
 Turning World (1996)
 The Lakes (1997) - 4 episodes
 Shockers (1999) - 1 episode
 Anna Karenina (2000)
 The Street (2006–09)
 Tess of the D'Urbervilles (2008)
 Accused (2010-2012) - 6 episodes
 Playhouse Presents: Snodgrass (2013) - 1 episode
 The Suspicions of Mr Whicher (2014) - 1 episode
 Isolation Stories: Karen (2020)

Awards
 BAFTA Television Award for Best Drama Series (2007)

References

British television directors
British film directors
Living people
Year of birth missing (living people)